Upside Down was an English boy band which consisted of Chris Leng, Giles Kristian, Jamie Browne and Richard Micallef. The formation of the band was featured in the late night BBC Television documentary series, Inside Story.

The band was developed by World Records, an independent record label who had staked everything on the success of their act. Their first single, "Change Your Mind", was written for fellow 1990s boy band Bad Boys Inc and jumped from No. 35 to No. 12 in the charts, peaking at No. 11 a week later. After four hit singles, World Records went into bankruptcy and Upside Down re-grouped as Orange Orange with no further success. Kristian went on to be a bestselling author of historical fiction.

Discography

Singles
As Upside Down
 "Change Your Mind" (World Records - 1996) No. 11 UK
 "Every Time I Fall in Love" (World Records - 1996) No. 18 UK
 "Never Found a Love Like This Before" (World Records - 1996) No. 19 UK
 "If You Leave Me Now" (World Records - 1996) No. 27 UK
As Orange Orange
 "Beautiful Day" (Blue Cherry/Big Banana's - 1997) No. 83 UK

References

Musical groups established in 1995
Musical groups disestablished in 1997
English boy bands
English pop music groups